N. occultus may refer to:
 Natronococcus occultus, an archaea species in the genus Natronococcus
 Nicagus occultus, a beetle species in the genus Nicagus
 Nosferattus occultus, a spider species

See also
 Occultus (disambiguation)